Glenfield railway station served the village of Glenfield, Leicestershire, England, from 1832 to 1928 on the Leicester and Swannington Railway.

History

First station 

The first station was opened on 18 July 1832 by the Leicester and Swannington Railway. The services were cut back to only Saturdays from 24 December 1847, although they fully resumed on 27 March 1848. It was resited to the east of the level crossing in 1875.

Second station 

The second station opened in 1875.  It closed on 24 September 1928 but it was later used for a school excursion to Port Sunlight on 1 July 1938 and an excursion to Mablethorpe on 2 July 1938. The station building was used as a goods office until 1965.

References 

Transport in Leicester
Disused railway stations in Leicestershire
Railway stations in Great Britain opened in 1832
Railway stations in Great Britain closed in 1875
Railway stations in Great Britain opened in 1875
Railway stations in Great Britain closed in 1928
1832 establishments in England
1928 disestablishments in England